Taavi Toom (born on 7 September 1970 in Tartu) is an Estonian diplomat.

In 1993 he graduated from University of Tartu with a degree in law. Since 1994 he has worked for the Estonian Foreign Ministry.

2001-2006 he was Ambassador of Estonia to Denmark. Since 2009 he is Ambassador of Estonia to Poland.

References

Living people
1970 births
Estonian diplomats
Ambassadors of Estonia to Denmark
Ambassadors of Estonia to Poland
University of Tartu alumni
People from Tartu